Franck Dannique Elemba Owaka (born 21 July 1990) is an athlete from the Republic of the Congo competing in the shot put. He represented his country at the 2014 World Indoor Championships and 2015 World Championships, as well as team Africa at the 2010 and 2014 Continental Cup.

He was born in Brazzaville, and represented his country at the 2016 Summer Olympics where he was placed 4th in the shot put with a throw of 21.20 metres. He was the flag bearer for the Republic of Congo during the Parade of Nations.

He has personal bests of 21.20 metres outdoors (Rio de Janeiro 2016) and 20.53 metres indoors (Karlsruhe 2016). Both results are current national records.

Earlier in his career he competed in judo, before turning to athletics in 2006.

Competition record

References

1990 births
Living people
Republic of the Congo shot putters
Male shot putters
Republic of the Congo male athletes
Sportspeople from Brazzaville
World Athletics Championships athletes for the Republic of the Congo
Athletes (track and field) at the 2015 African Games
Athletes (track and field) at the 2019 African Games
Athletes (track and field) at the 2016 Summer Olympics
Olympic athletes of the Republic of the Congo
African Games gold medalists for the Republic of the Congo
African Games medalists in athletics (track and field)
African Games bronze medalists for the Republic of the Congo